Ellerslie is a historic plantation house located near Linden, Cumberland County, North Carolina. It was built about 1790, and is a 1 1/2-story, six bay by two bay, Georgian style frame dwelling with a two-story Greek Revival style addition. It features a wide shed porch with plastered cove ceiling.

It was listed on the National Register of Historic Places in 1980.

History
Ellerslie's founder, George Elliot, was born in Scotland in 1755. He immigrated to the American colonies around 1774 and soon entered the lumber business along the Cape Fear River Valley. After building Ellerslie sometime between 1790-1801, Elliot emerged as the largest landowner in his district and was an active political leader. In 1788 he represented Cumberland County at the Hillsborough Convention, which had been called to vote on the new United States Constitution.

Ellerslie’s location on the Lower Little River was important for community and commerce. The Little River and the Cape Fear River connected the Highland-Scot community with Wilmington, NC and closely linked the regions commercially. Additionally, the Elliot family cemetery was located where the Little River joins the Cape Fear River.

During the American Civil War, the Ellerslie Plantation was used at separate times to quarter both Confederate and Union troops. Prior to the Battle of Averasborough, Federal troops under Union Maj. Gen. William T. Sherman raided Ellerslie. The encounter was recorded by resident and Civil War diarist Jane Evans Elliot:

Notable residents
John Newland Maffitt (privateer), the renowned Confederate blockade runner, spent part of his childhood on the Ellerslie Plantation after he was adopted around 1824 by his uncle Dr. William Maffitt, a respected Cumberland County physician. The Maffitt family home was on or near the Ellerslie estate. Contrary to some reports, Dr. Maffitt did not own the Ellerslie plantation.
Jane Evans Elliot (1820-1886), the Civil War memoirist, lived at Ellerslie after marrying Col. Alexander Elliot.
 Henry Elliot, the Elliot Pecan's namesake, was raised at Ellerslie. He was the son of Col. Alexander Elliot and Jane Evans Elliot.

References

Plantation houses in North Carolina
Houses on the National Register of Historic Places in North Carolina
Georgian architecture in North Carolina
Greek Revival houses in North Carolina
Houses completed in 1790
Houses in Cumberland County, North Carolina
National Register of Historic Places in Cumberland County, North Carolina